Shippagan-Lamèque-Miscou is a provincial electoral district for the Legislative Assembly of New Brunswick, Canada.  It was previously named Shippagan-les-Îles from 1974 to 1995 and Lamèque-Shippagan-Miscou from 1995 to 2014.  Its boundaries were largely unchanged from its creation until the 2013 redistribution extended it inland to the Pokemouche area, taken from Centre-Péninsule-Saint-Sauveur.

Members of the Legislative Assembly

Electoral results

Shippagan-Lamèque-Miscou

Lamèque-Shippagan-Miscou

Shippagan-les-Îles

References

External links 
Website of the Legislative Assembly of New Brunswick
Map of riding as of 2018

New Brunswick provincial electoral districts